Frances Stevens may refer to:
 Frances Simpson Stevens (1894–1976), American painter
 Frances "Franco" Stevens (born 1967), founder of Curve magazine